Bruno Blanchet (1760–1822) was an interim president of the Republic of Haiti.

Political context
The government of Jean-Jacques Dessalines decided to undertake an agrarian reform for the benefit of the former slaves without land, he was assassinated on 17 in Pont-Rouge, north of Port-au-Prince, by his collaborators, Alexandre Pétion, Jean-Pierre Boyer, André Rigaud and Bruno Blanchet who acted as an intermediary between all of them without forgetting Henri Christophe who was in the north.

During the secession of the North of Haiti by King Henry, the South of the country became a republic under the military authority of Alexander Pétion. Nevertheless, during the first months of 1807, power was still vacant in the South since the partition of the country in December 1806.

Political responsibility
Bruno Blanchet took part in the Constituent Assembly on 18 December 1806. He presented to the National Assembly on 27 December 1806, the report of the commission with a view to getting the new Constitution adopted before the parliamentarians. Haiti is declared a republic with a president and a senate, and a rigid separation of powers between the two. Christophe will not accept the terms of this new Constitution and will try to take Port-au-Prince (early January 1807). He will be repulsed by the defenders of Alexander Pétion and will retire to the North of Haiti.

Secretary of State Bruno Blanchet provisionally becomes Acting President of the Republic of Haiti from 19 January 1807 to 10 March 1807.

On 10 March 1807, Alexander Pétion officially became President of the Republic and appointed Bruno Blanchet Secretary General of the Government.

References

Presidents of Haiti
Finance ministers of Haiti
Haitian people of Mulatto descent
People from Sud (department)
Members of the Senate (Haiti)
19th-century Haitian politicians
19th-century heads of government
Haitian people of Grenadian descent
Haitian rebel slaves
Haitian slaves
Suicides by firearm in Haiti
Haitian politicians who committed suicide
Haitian independence activists
People of Saint-Domingue
1800s in Haiti
1810s in Haiti
1820s in Haiti
19th-century monarchs in North America
1760 births
1822 deaths
1820s suicides